Bhagwanpur is a village and corresponding community development block in Kaimur district of Bihar, India. As of 2011, its population was 6,213, in 1,081 households, while the total block population was 91,113, in 15,145 households.

The famous Mundeshwari Temple is located in Ramgarh village of Bhagwanpur block.

Geography 
Bhagwanpur is a hilly block with no canal systems; irrigation is done instead with ditches and ponds.

Demographics 
The 2011 census of India reported that Bhagwanpur block had a sex ratio of 923 females to every 1000 males (about the same as the district ratio of 920). The sex ratio was higher in the 0-6 age group, with 971 females for every 1000 males; the sex ratio in this group was the highest in Kaimur district. Of the block's total population of 91,113, a total of 16,968 people were ages 0–6. Members of scheduled castes made up 27.26% of the block population, and members of scheduled tribes made up 2.52%. The literacy rate in Bhagwanpur block was 65.10% (74.40% among men and 54.91% among women), which was a bit lower than the district average of 69.34%.

Most of the block's workforce was employed in agriculture in 2011, with 27.27% of workers being cultivators who owned or leased their own land and another 50.23% being agricultural labourers who worked someone else's land for wages. An additional 7.03% of workers were counted as household industry workers, and the remaining 15.46% were other workers. The majority of Bhagwanpur block's workforce was male, with 21,208 being men and 7,661 being women.

Villages 
Bhagwanpur block contains the following 135 villages:

References 

Villages in Kaimur district